Stephenson is a surname.

Stephenson may also refer to:

Places
In the United States:
Stephenson, Michigan
Stephenson, Wisconsin
Stephenson County, Illinois
Stephenson Township, Michigan

Other
Stephenson College, Durham, a college of the University of Durham, England
Stephenson College, Coalville, in Leicestershire with a campus in Lenton, Nottingham, England
Stephenson High School, Stone Mountain, Georgia
Stephenson's Rocket, an early steam locomotive
Stephenson Scholarship Hall, University of Kansas, in the United States
Stephenson's Catalogue, an astronomical catalogue
The John Stephenson Company, a major builder of streetcars in the 19th and early 20th centuries
Stephenson gauge, a railway track gauge

See also
 Stevenson (disambiguation)